A by-election was held for the Australian House of Representatives seat of Parkes on 31 January 1931. This was triggered by the resignation of Labor MP Edward McTiernan to take a seat on the High Court.

The by-election was won by Nationalist candidate Charles Marr, who had represented the seat from 1919 until his defeat by McTiernan in 1929.

This was the first time the Communist Party endorsed a candidate at federal level.

Results

References

1931 elections in Australia
New South Wales federal by-elections